South Carolina Highway 764 (SC 764) is a  state highway in the U.S. state of South Carolina. The highway connects rural areas of Richland County with Eastover.

Route description
SC 764 begins at an intersection with U.S. Route 76 (US 76) and US 378 (Garners Ferry Road), northeast of McEntire Joint National Guard Base, and east-southeast of Horrell Hill, within Richland County. It travels to the southeast and crosses over Toms Creek. It curves to the south-southeast and crosses Ray Branch. The highway curves back to the southeast and begins paralleling railroad tracks; then, it enters Eastover. In town, it passes a U.S. Post Office before intersecting the southern terminus of SC 263 (Vanboklen Street). The highway crosses over Griffins Creek and leaves town. SC 764 continues traveling through rural areas of the county and curves to the east-northeast, where it no longer parallels the railroad tracks mentioned above. A very short distance later, it meets its eastern terminus, an intersection with US 601 (McCords Ferry Road). Here, the roadway continues as an access road to Kensington Mansion.

Major intersections

See also

References

External links

SC 764 at Virginia Highways' South Carolina Highways Annex

764
Transportation in Richland County, South Carolina